Croatia–India relations  are the bilateral ties between Croatia and India. Diplomatic relations between two countries were officially established on 9 July 1992 following Croatia's independence from SFR Yugoslavia.

Croatia is represented in India through its embassy in New Delhi and consulates in Mumbai and Kolkata. India is represented in Croatia through its embassy in Zagreb.

Bilateral agreements 
The Indian Embassy of Croatia lists the following agreements and MoUs

Agreements 
 Trade and Economic Cooperation Agreement (1994).
 Maritime Transport Agreement (1997).
 Agreement on Cooperation in the field of Culture, Science and Technology, Education and Sports (1999).
 Agreement on cooperation between the Diplomatic Academy of the Ministry of Foreign Affairs of Croatia and the Foreign Service Institute (FSI), Ministry of External Affairs  (2000).
 Air Services Agreement (2000).
 Bilateral Investment Protection Agreement (2001).
 Agreement on cooperation in the Fight against International Illicit Trafficking of Narcotic Drugs, Terrorism etc. (2001).  First meeting of the Joint Committee held in Zagreb  (2004).
 Agreement on Agricultural Cooperation (2002).
 Agreement on exemption of visa requirement for holders of Diplomatic and Official/Service Passports (2007).
 Agreement on Cooperation in Health and Medicine (June 2010).
 Agreement on Avoidance of Double Taxation and for the Prevention of Fiscal Evasion with respect to taxes on income (DTAA) (signed in February 2014).

MoUs 
 MoU between the Croatian Bank for Reconstruction and Development (HBOR) and the EXIM Bank of India (2000).
 MoU between Export Credit & Guarantee Corporation of India Ltd. (ECGC) and the Croatian Bank for Reconstruction and Development (HBOR (2002).
 MoU on cooperation in Information Technology: signed between Electronics & Computer Software Export Promotion Council of India and the Croatian Information Technology Society (2004).
 Exchange Programme in the field of Culture for 2005-07 (2005).
 Programme of Cooperation in Science and Technology for 2005-08 (2005).
 Educational Exchange Programme (2006).
 Programme of Cooperation in the field of Culture for 2010-12 (June 2010).
 MoU between ICCR and the University of Zagreb on the establishment of ICCR Chair of Hindi for 2012-2019 (signed on 17 October 2012).

Historical background 
Croatian sailors and merchants from the Republic of Ragusa may have established contact with Goa, India, in the 16th century.

See also  
 Foreign relations of Croatia 
 Foreign relations of India
 India–Yugoslavia relations
 Yugoslavia and the Non-Aligned Movement

Notes 

 
India 
Bilateral relations of India